Millbrook railway station may refer to:

Millbrook railway station (Bedfordshire), in Bedfordshire, England
Millbrook railway station (Hampshire), in Hampshire, England
Millbrook railway station (Jersey), in the Bailiwick of Jersey
Millbrook railway station, Victoria, in Victoria, Australia